Raymond Stevens "Thunder" Tumlin Jr. (born April 17, 1947) is an American politician. He was a member of the Georgia House of Representatives representing District 38, which encompasses parts of Cobb County. He became mayor of Marietta, GA in 2010 and was reelected in 2013. Tumlin has served as Chairman of the Board of the Marietta Board of Education.  He serves as Chairman of the Marietta Board of Lights and Water and was elected to the Board Of Directors of the Municipal Electric Association of Georgia (MEAG) in 2013.  Tumlin is a member of the Republican Party.

Tumlin is a Certified Public Accountant and an attorney, earning his undergraduate degree from the University of Georgia, an MBA from the University of Denver, and his JD from Georgia State University's College of Law. Tumlin practices law as a tax attorney in Marietta.

References

1947 births
Living people
People from Marietta, Georgia
Georgia State University College of Law alumni
Republican Party members of the Georgia House of Representatives
21st-century American politicians